Rjavica is a settlement on the right bank of the Sotla River in the Municipality of Rogaška Slatina in eastern Slovenia. The entire Rogaška Slatina area is part of the traditional region of Styria. It is now included in the Savinja Statistical Region.

References

External links
Rjavica on Geopedia

Populated places in the Municipality of Rogaška Slatina